Arabized Berber denotes an inhabitant of the Maghreb region in western North Africa, whose native language is a local dialect of Arabic and whose ethnic origins are Berber.

Most populations in the Maghreb are of Berber heritage, including those inhabiting Morocco, Algeria, Tunisia, and Libya. The widespread language shift from Berber to Arabic happened, at least partially, due to the privileged status that the Arabic language has generally been given in the states of North Africa, from the Arab conquest in 652 up until the French colonialism in the twentieth century, as well as the migration of the Banu Hilal and Banu Sulaym tribes from Arabia to North Africa.

Historical perspective

Medieval Arabic sources frequently refer to North Africa (excluding Egypt) as Bilad Al Barbar or 'Land of the Berbers'  prior to the Muslim conquest of the Maghreb. This designation may have given rise to the term Barbary Coast which was used by Europeans until the 19th century to refer to coastal Northwest Africa. But the cultural impact of Islam was big as it was the only boost for the spread of the Arabic language.

Since the populations were partially affiliated with the Arab Muslim culture, North Africa was starting to be referred to by the Arabic speakers as Al-Maġrib (meaning "The West") since it was considered as the western part of the known world. For historical references, medieval Arab and Muslim historians and geographers used to refer to Morocco as Al-Maghrib al Aqşá, disambiguating it from neighboring historical regions called Al-Maghrib al Awsat (Algeria), and Al-Maghrib al Adna (Tunisia and Libya).

Even though many of these cities have often been linguistically Arabized (like Fes or Marrakesh), from a historic point of view it is accepted  that the core population of North Africa is Berber. More than rural areas, the cities were a melting pot of different ethnicities, so the city dwellers are more likely to have non-pure Berber ancestry.

By tracing the history of certain Maghrebian areas, historians are able to make assertions about its inhabitants. For instance, even though Casablanca (Berber name: Anfa) and Rabat were both built and originally settled by Berbers, it is known that the area's original inhabitants were ousted by the Almohads and subsequently resettled with nomadic Banu Hilal Arabs. Other, traditionally Berber, cities like Tangiers, Meknes and Marrakesh have never had such a drastic repopulation, so it could be assumed that its inhabitants today are of Berber stock. Although these cities have for centuries now been linguistically Arabized, their culture and identity often have not been through that process. The cities of Tangiers, Tetouan, Meknes and Marrakesh still have a strong regional Berber aspect to them and their inhabitants do not necessarily consider themselves to be ethnically Arab, even though their language might be today's Moroccan-Arabic.

Berberists and linguistic Arabization

According to Berber activists, Algerians and Moroccans are overwhelmingly Berber, whose identity requires a reawakening.

North Africa was gradually Arabized with the spread of Islam in the 7th century AD, when the liturgical language Arabic was first brought to the Maghreb. However, the identity of northwestern Africa remained Berber for a long time thereafter. Additionally, even though the process of Arabization began with these early invasions, many large parts of North Africa were only recently Arabized like the Aurès (Awras) mountains in the 19th and 20th centuries. Although, the fertile plains of North Africa seem to have been (at least partly) Arabized in the 11th century with the emigration of the Banu Hilal tribes from Arabia.

See also
 Arab-Berber
 Berbers and Islam
 Kabylism
 Berbers
 Algerian nationalism
 Berberism
 Tamazgha
 Maghreb
 Muslim conquest of the Maghreb

Notes

Arabized Berbers
Ethnic groups in North Africa
Maghreb